Samuel Ajibola is a Nigerian television and film actor, model and events compere. He is best known for his role as a child-actor in the Opa Williams directed movie Tears for Love, as well as his role as Spiff in the Africa Magic TV series The Johnsons. Ajibola is also famous for being the first Nigerian child actor to win the award for Best Kid Actor for three years in a row.
On March 4, 2017, he won the AMVCA (Africa Magic Viewers Choice Award) for best Actor in an M-net comedy series The Johnsons.

Early life
Ajibola was born in Mazamaza, Lagos State. He is the first of four children of Commander Lanre Ajibola and Mrs Irene Ajibola. He is of Yoruba descent and hails from Ekiti State. Ajibola began his acting career in 1995 at the age of 6 in the Opa Williams directed movie, Tears for Love. He got the role, after he had impressed his aunt, Moyinoluwa Odutayo, herself an actress, during a stage play at Church. 
He went on to feature as a child actor in other feature films including Without Love, Shame, Eye-witness, Onome II, Conspiracy, Street kids and Day of Reckoning. In 2003, he took a hiatus from acting to finish his high school education and pursue a degree in Political Science at the University of Lagos, after which he performed his National Youth Service programme. He also acquired a degree in acting from Amaka Igwe's Centre for Excellence in Film and Media Studies.

Career
In 2009, Ajibola made a return to acting in the Teco Benson produced and directed movie, The Fake Prophet alongside Grace Amah. In 2013, he featured in the MTV Base produced television series, Shuga. He has also featured in several Nigerian box office movies including Last Flight to Abuja with Omotola Jalade Ekeinde, The Antique alongside Kiki Omeili, Judith Audu and Gloria Young. As of 2016, he had played the role of Spiff, a character in the Africa Magic produced television series The Johnsons for four seasons. He also starred in the 2018 movie Merry Men: The Real Yoruba Demons.

Ajibola made his production debut with the release of his web series "Dele Issues" on March 10, 2017. In October 2017, he featured former Nigerian President Olusegun Obasanjo on the web series.

Awards and recognition
In 1996, Ajibola won the award for Best Kid Actor at the Rhema Awards for his role in the movie Eye-Witness, an award he went on to win at the 1997 and 1998 Reel Awards for the movies Onome II and Day of Reckoning respectively. In 2014, he won the award for Best Actor at the In-Short Movie Awards.

In March 2017, Ajibola won the Best Actor in a Comedy Award at the 2017 AMVCA Awards. Ajibola also won the Comic Actor of the Year Award at the 2017 City People Awards in October, 2017.

Awards

Filmography

Movie roles

Short films

Television roles

References 

Living people
Male actors from Lagos State
Nigerian male television actors
Nigerian male film actors
Nigerian male models
Nigerian male child actors
Yoruba male actors
University of Lagos alumni
Best Actor Africa Movie Academy Award winners
Actors from Ekiti State
Nigerian film producers
1989 births